"Dakota" Dave Hull (born April 19, 1950 in Fargo, North Dakota, United States) is an American acoustic fingerstyle guitarist who plays in a variety of styles: blues, gospel, ragtime, and folk music. He is also a recognized music historian and published one book, 2012's Ragtime Guitar in the Classic American Style.

Musical career
Hull was born in Fargo, North Dakota, which led to his nickname "Dakota Dave". He has long been a fixture of the West Bank music scene in Minneapolis, Minnesota. He has toured the world playing solo fingerstyle guitar in multiple genres including American folk music, ragtime, gospel, and blues. He hosted the radio show The Dakota Dave Hull Show on KFAI radio in Minneapolis for 20 years and was a frequent performer on A Prairie Home Companion.

Hull has engineered, produced and performed with many artists, include Doc Watson, Dave Van Ronk, Utah Phillips, "Spider" John Koerner, Duck Baker, Dave "Snaker" Ray, and Peter Ostroushko.

Critical reception
Reviewing Hull's 1991 album Reunion Rag for AllMusic, Richard Foss praised "Hull's astonishing skill as both a guitarist and composer. At times Hull sounds like John Fahey during the latter's sunnier moments, playing bright ragtime pieces and introspective tunes inspired by American traditional and old timey music. ... Many of these pieces deserve to become classics."

Discography

Solo
 Hull’s Victory (Flying Fish, 1983)
 Reunion Rag (Flying Fish, 1991)
 New Shirt (Arabica, 1994)
 Sheridan Square Rag (Arabica, 2002)
 The Loyalty Waltz (Arabica, 2004)
 Time Machine (Arabica, 2007)
 Under the North Star (Arabica, 2013)
 Heavenly Hope (Arabica 2016)
 This Earthly Life (Arabica, 2016)
 Another Cup (Arabica, 2018)
 The Graveyard Shift (Arabica, 2019)

With others
 Ace Pickin’ and Sweet Harmony (Train on the Island Records, 1977) with Sean Blackburn
 North by Southwest (Biscuit City Records, 1978) with Sean Blackburn
 River of Swing (Flying Fish, 1977) with Sean Blackburn
 Moonbeams (Arabica, 1999) as Hull & Larson with Kari Larson
 The Goose is Getting Fat (Arabica, 2000) as Hull & Larson with Kari Larson
 Airship (Arabica, 2007) with Pop Wagner
 When You Ask a Girl to Leave Her Happy Home (Arabica, 2011) with Duck Baker

References

External links
Official Dakota Dave Hull website
 [ Allmusic]

American blues guitarists
American male guitarists
Fingerstyle guitarists
Musicians from Minneapolis
Musicians from North Dakota
Living people
20th-century American guitarists
20th-century American male musicians
1950 births